A mantle is a piece of clothing, a type of cloak. Several other meanings are derived from that.

Mantle may refer to:

Mantle (clothing), a cloak-like garment worn mainly by women as fashionable outerwear
Mantle (vesture), an Eastern Orthodox vesture worn by monastics and higher clergy
Mantle (royal garment), a garment worn by monarchs and princes as a symbol of authority
Mantle (heraldry), a heraldic element
Mantle (geology), a layer in the interior of a planet
 The Earth's mantle
Mantle (surname)
Mantle, a feature of bird anatomy
Mantle (climbing), the external covering of a climbing rope.
Mantle, a black and white dog coat colour, especially in Great Danes
Mantle (mollusc), a layer of tissue in molluscs which secretes the shell
Fireplace mantle or mantel, the hood over the grate of a fire
Gas mantle, a device for generating bright white light when heated by a flame
Mantle Site, Wendat (Huron) Ancestral Village, in Whitchurch-Stouffville, near Toronto
Mantle (API), a low-level GPU API developed by AMD

Entertainment
The Mantle, an album by Agalloch
Greenmantle, a novel by John Buchan

See also 
Mantel (disambiguation)
Mantell (disambiguation)
Mantling, heraldry drapery that is tied to the helmet above the shield

fr:Manteau
lt:Mantija (reikšmės)
ru:Мантия (значения)